Chah Lashkaran may refer to:
 Chah Lashkaran-e Bala
 Chah Lashkaran-e Pain